Lisboa Games Week, or simply LGW, is a trade fair for video games held annually at the FIL Exhibition Centre in Lisbon, Portugal. It is organised by FIL - International Fair of Lisbon ) with the approval of Portuguese Ministry of Education (Direcção Geral de Educação - Equipa de Recursos e Tecnologias Educativas).

Dates

References

External links 
  
 DGE/ERTE Home Page (Directorate-General for Education/Team of Educational Resources and Technologies)
 Fundação AIP Home Page (AIP Foundation)
 Trade shows games

Trade fairs in Portugal
Video game trade shows
Video gaming in Portugal
Annual events in Lisbon
Computer-related trade shows
Festivals in Lisbon
Recurring events established in 2010
2014 establishments in Portugal
Tourist attractions in Lisbon
Autumn events in Portugal